The Central Weather Bureau (CWB) is the government meteorological research and forecasting institution of the Republic of China (Taiwan). In addition to meteorology, the Central Weather Bureau also makes astronomical observations, reports on sea conditions, and conducts research into seismology and provides earthquake reports. The Central Weather Bureau is headquartered in Taipei City and is administered under the Ministry of Transportation and Communications.

History
While Taiwan was under Japanese rule, the government set up five weather monitoring stations on the island, located in Taipei, Taichung, Tainan, Hengchun, and Penghu. On 19 December 1897, the Governor-General moved the headquarters to the present location occupied by the eventual successor agency of the Japanese "Taipei Observatory": the Central Weather Bureau. In 1945 when the Kuomintang took control of Taiwan the various stations set up by the Japanese were incorporated into the new Taiwan Provincial Weather Institution, under the Chief Executive of Taiwan Province, Chen Yi. When the position of Chief Executive was abolished in 1947 (the new head of local government being the Governor of Taiwan Province) the institution became an agency of the Taiwan Provincial Government.

The Central Weather Bureau itself was established in 1941 in Chongqing under the Executive Yuan of the Republic of China. In 1947 (and again from 1971 onwards) it was reassigned to the Ministry of Transportation and Communications. After the Kuomintang defeat in the Chinese Civil War and their subsequent flight to Taiwan in 1949, the Central Weather Bureau relocated from Mainland China to Taiwan. From 1949 to 1958 it was under the control of the Taiwan Provincial Weather Institution, then from 1958 onwards it was resurrected to become the principal meteorological organisation of the government. In 1971 the Central Weather Bureau switched from being a part of the Taiwan Provincial Government to the Ministry of Transportation and Communications, under central government authority.

Departments

The Central Weather Bureau has a number of responsibilities, represented by the various departments.

Weather Forecast Center
The Weather Forecast Center is the department responsible for monitoring actual weather conditions and making short and medium term forecasts concerning the weather. It also issues severe weather advisories for conditions including heavy rain, cold snaps, typhoons and storms, and dense fog. In the case of typhoons, the department closely monitors all tropical storms which might impact the island and issues warnings and predicted typhoon path and severity based on the collected data.

Seismological Center
The Seismological Center of the Central Weather Bureau was founded in 1989, with a mission to monitor seismic activity in and around the island, publish reports on significant earthquakes, study earthquake precursor phenomena, issue tsunami warnings where appropriate, and provide information to the public of earthquake precautions. Taiwan is in a seismically active region on the Pacific Ring of Fire, with 44 deadly earthquakes occurring there during the twentieth century. The center has 150 seismological monitoring stations through Taiwan, Penghu, Kinmen (Quemoy) and Matsu.

Marine Cable Hosted Observatory
The Marine Cable Hosted Observatory (MACHO) is a system of underwater sensors connected by fiber optic cable. A 620-km system strung between Yilan and Pingtung. MACHO allows a 10-second warning before a quake and 20-30 minutes warning of a subsequent tsunami. An 800-km system is under construction to monitor the Mariana Trench which is expected to be completed in 2024.

Marine Meteorology Center
The Marine Meteorology Center was established in 1993 to monitor sea conditions and make predictions about weather at sea for shipping, fisheries, tourism and other interested parties. Variables including wave height, tides, sea level variations, sea surface temperature, and ocean currents are measured to provide an accurate picture of current conditions. The center is also responsible for informing the public of tide times, and cooperates with local tourism bureaux and Fishermen's Associations to erect electronic billboards in harbours to inform seafarers of ocean conditions.

Other departments
The Bureau also includes the following departments:
The Meteorological Satellite Center, which receives and analyses weather satellite data for observation and prediction purposes.
The Astronomical Observatory, which not only observes astronomical phenomena such as sunspots and eclipses, but also publishes an annual almanac and provides information on astronomy to the public.

Transportation
The CWB building is accessible within walking distance South from NTU Hospital Station of the Taipei Metro.

Supercomputing
A research supercomputer shared between the Central Weather Bureau and CAA was listed by TOP500 as the world's 313rd most powerful computer in 2002, obtaining 0.2 TFlop/s with 25 300MHz cores.

See also
 Ministry of Transportation and Communications (Republic of China)
 Climate of Taiwan
 Former Tainan Weather Observatory
 China Meteorological Administration, whose Public Weather Service Center treats Taiwan as a PRC province and issues forecasts for it

References

Central Weather Bureau
Governmental meteorological agencies in Asia
1941 establishments in Taiwan
Government agencies established in 1941